Helvacı can refer to:

 Helvacı, Çan
 Helvacı, Karataş